Year 1430 (MCDXXX) was a common year starting on Sunday (link will display the full calendar) of the Julian calendar.

Events 
 January–December 
 January 7 – Philip the Good, Duke of Burgundy, marries Isabella of Portugal. 
 January 10 – Philip the Good founds the Order of the Golden Fleece.
 March 29 – The Ottoman Empire, under Murad II, captures Thessalonica after an eight-year siege.
 May 14 – The French first attempt to relieve the Siege of Compiègne.
 May 23 – Joan of Arc is captured by the Burgundians, while leading an army to relieve Compiègne.
 June 14 – William Waynflete becomes vicar of Skendleby, Lincolnshire.
 July 11 – Battle of Trnava: The Hussites defeat the Hungarian-Moravian-Serbian army.
 October 27 – Švitrigaila succeeds his cousin as ruler of Lithuania.

 Date unknown 
 With the surrender of Chalandritsa and the citadel of Patras to the Byzantine Despotate of the Morea, the Principality of Achaea comes to an end.
 Bratislava Castle is converted to a fortress under Sigismund of Luxemburg.
 Optical methods are first used in the creation of art.

Births 
 March 10 – Oliviero Carafa, Italian Catholic cardinal (d. 1511)
 March 23 – Margaret of Anjou, queen of Henry VI of England (d. 1482)
 June 13 – Beatrice, Duchess of Viseu, Portuguese infante (d. 1506)
 June 27 – Henry Holland, 3rd Duke of Exeter, Lancastrian leader during the English Wars of the Roses (d. 1475)
 October 16 – King James II of Scotland (d. 1460) and his twin Alexander Stewart, Duke of Rothesay (d. 1430)
 October 28 – Richard West, 7th Baron De La Warr, English soldier, son of Reginald West (d. 1475)
 November 11 – Jošt of Rožmberk, Bishop of Breslau, Grand Prior of the Order of St. John (d. 1467)
 date unknown
 Hosokawa Katsumoto, Japanese warlord
 Barbara von Ottenheim, German alleged witch and sculpture model (d. 1484) 
 Isabel Bras Williamson, Scottish merchant (d. 1493)
 Joana de Castre, Catalan noble (d. 1480)
 probable – Heinrich Kramer, German churchman and inquisitor (d. 1505)
 approximate – Clara Hätzlerin, German scribe (d. 1476)

Deaths 
 January 5 – Philippa of England, queen consort of Denmark, Norway and Sweden (b. 1394)
 January 29 or 1427 – Andrei Rublev, Russian iconographer (possible date; b. 1360)
 April 18 – John III, Count of Nassau-Siegen, German count
 August 4 – Philip I, Duke of Brabant (b. 1404)
 August 18 – Thomas de Ros, 8th Baron de Ros, English soldier and politician (b. 1406)
 October 27 – Vytautas, Grand Prince of Lithuania (b. 1352)
 date unknown
 Thomas FitzAlan, English noble
 Christine de Pizan, Italian proto-feminist writer (b. 1364)

References